Varnish is a mixture used primarily to coat wood.

Varnish may also refer to:
 Varnish (software), a reverse proxy and HTTP accelerator
 Jessica Varnish, British track cyclist
 Desert varnish, a coating found on exposed rock surfaces in arid environments
 Fluoride varnish, applied to the tooth's surface in dentistry

See also 
Vanish (disambiguation)